Vaidyaratnam P. S. Warrier (10 April 1869 – 30 January 1944) was an Ayurveda practitioner from Kerala, India. He is well-regarded as the founder of Kottakkal Arya Vaidyasala, a major Ayurvedic treatment centre in Kerala.

Life and career
Panniyinpally Sankunni Warrier was born in 1869 in Kottakkal in erstwhile Malabar district in Madras Presidency. His parents were Marayamangalam Rama Warrier and Panniyinpally Kunjukutti Warasiar. He was the eldest son of his parents.

Young Sankunni started his lessons in Ayurveda under the classical Gurukula system from Kuttanchery Vasudevan Mooss, a Brahmin who belonged to one of the eight families of Ayurvedic practitioner in Kerala, the ashtavaidyans, in the year 1886 as a seventeen-year-old. He also acquired proficiency in the practice of Allopathy.

In 1902, Warrier founded 
Arya Vaidya Sala for the manufacture and sale of ayurvedic medicines which later became synonymous with ayurvedic treatment in India. The Patasala established in 1917 has now become an Ayurveda College affiliated to Kerala University of Health Science (KUHS). 

The Group now comprises:
 5 hospitals with 20 branches
 1200 authorized medicine dealerships
 3 Medicine factories
 Ayurveda Medical College
 200 acres of Herbal Garden
 Research & Development Centre and
 Publication Department

Warrier is credited with pioneering the practice of manufacturing ayurvedic medicines. He also wrote text books for students of Ayurveda. One of them, Ashtangasariram, won a certificate in 1932 from the National Organisation of Physicians. He was an art connoisseur and founded a drama troupe which was developed to be the famous Kathakali troupe, P.S.V. Natyasangham.

He died in 1944 at the age of 75. He was succeeded by his nephew P. Madhava Warrier, who continued until his death in an aeroplane crash in 1953. Later Arya Vaidya Sala is managed by his youngest nephew Dr. P. K. Warrier, who continued for 68 years until his death in 2021, aged 100.

Major awards and Recognitions

In 1933, in recognition of his services to humanity, P. S. Varier was conferred the title of 'Vaidyaratna' by Viceroy and Governor General of British India. The Government of India has issued a postage stamp in his honour bearing his image.

References

External links

 Arya Vaidya Sala Web Site
 Write up on Kottakkal Arya Vaidya Sala
 Ayurveda Medical College Web Site
 Documentary on Arya Vaidya Sala in Malayalam - https://www.youtube.com/watch?v=IuPbz-etmMI

People from Malappuram district
1869 births
1944 deaths
Ayurvedacharyas from Kerala
19th-century Indian medical doctors
20th-century Indian medical doctors